Hervin Scicchitano Ongenda (born 24 June 1995) is a French professional footballer who plays as an attacking midfielder or a winger for Liga I club Rapid București.

Club career
Described by French newspaper Le Parisien as the top talent in a generation of French players which included Kingsley Coman, Anthony Martial and Adrien Rabiot, Ongenda made his debut for Paris Saint-Germain on 6 January 2013, in a Coupe de France 4–3 victory over Arras.

On 3 August 2013, he featured in the Trophée des Champions against Bordeaux, coming on for Javier Pastore in the 73rd minute and scoring the equaliser eight minutes later as PSG went on to win 2–1. He registered his first Ligue 1 match at 9 August, in a 1–1 draw at Montpellier. Ongenda was loaned for the 2014–15 season to fellow league side Bastia. Upon his return in the capital, he scored his first Ligue 1 goal on 22 November 2015, in a 2–1 defeat of Lorient.

Ongenda joined Dutch side Zwolle in January 2017; despite signing a three-and-a-half-year deal with Zwolle, he only spent five months there and played games before being released. On 12 March 2018, having not made an official appearance in more than a year, he signed for Segunda División B side Real Murcia. He again left several months later, having played two games.

On 17 July 2018, Ongenda agreed a contract with Romanian team FC Botoșani. Ten days later, he made his Liga I debut in a 2–0 home victory against Hermannstadt. On 13 January 2020, he signed with Italian Serie B club Chievo until the end of the 2019–20 season, with an option to extend the contract until 2022. Ongenda returned to Botoșani in September 2020, after failing to make an impact during his stint in Italy.

International career
Born in France, Ongenda is of DR Congolese descent. He is a former youth international for France, having played up to the France U21s.

Honours
Paris Saint-Germain
Ligue 1: 2012–13, 2013–14, 2015–16
Coupe de France: 2015–16
Coupe de la Ligue: 2013–14, 2015–16 
Trophée des Champions: 2013, 2014, 2015, 2016

Individual
Titi d'Or: 2008, 2011

References

External links
 Eurosport profile
 
 
 

1995 births
Living people
Footballers from Paris
French sportspeople of Democratic Republic of the Congo descent
French footballers
France youth international footballers
France under-21 international footballers
Association football midfielders
Ligue 1 players
Paris Saint-Germain F.C. players
SC Bastia players
Eredivisie players
PEC Zwolle players
Segunda División B players
Real Murcia players
Liga I players
FC Botoșani players
Serie B players
A.C. ChievoVerona players
Cypriot First Division players
Apollon Limassol FC players
FC Rapid București players
Black French sportspeople
French expatriate footballers
French expatriate sportspeople in the Netherlands
Expatriate footballers in the Netherlands
French expatriate sportspeople in Spain
Expatriate footballers in Spain
Expatriate footballers in Romania
French expatriate sportspeople in Romania
Expatriate footballers in Italy
French expatriate sportspeople in Italy
Expatriate footballers in Cyprus
French expatriate sportspeople in Cyprus
21st-century Democratic Republic of the Congo people